The 1916 Dublin University by-election was held on 25 April 1916. The by-election was held due to the incumbent Irish Unionist MP, James Campbell, becoming Attorney General for Ireland. The seat was retained by Campbell who was unopposed due to a War-time electoral pact.

References

Bibliography

1916 elections in the United Kingdom
1916 elections in Ireland
April 1916 events
By-elections to the Parliament of the United Kingdom in Dublin University
Unopposed ministerial by-elections to the Parliament of the United Kingdom (need citation)